The finals and the qualifying heats of the women's 100 metre breaststroke event at the 1998 World Aquatics Championships were held on Tuesday 1998-01-13 in Perth, Western Australia.

A Final

B Final

Qualifying heats

See also
 1996 Women's Olympic Games 100m Breaststroke (Atlanta)
 1997 Women's World SC Championships 100m Breaststroke (Gothenburg)
 1997 Women's European LC Championships 100m Breaststroke (Seville)
 2000 Women's Olympic Games 100m Breaststroke (Sydney)

References
 
 

Swimming at the 1998 World Aquatics Championships
1998 in women's swimming